Serhiy Herasymets (born 20 August 1988) is a Ukrainian professional footballer who plays as a striker.

Career
Herasymets is the product of the FC Lokomotyv Kyiv and FC Dynamo Kyiv Sportive School Systems. His father is retired Belarusian footballer and current coach Syarhyey Hyerasimets Sr.

References

External links

1988 births
Living people
Ukrainian footballers
FC Inter Boyarka players
FC Knyazha Shchaslyve players
FC Knyazha-2 Shchaslyve players
FC Nafkom Brovary players
FC Nyva Vinnytsia players
FC Helios Kharkiv players
FC Hirnyk-Sport Horishni Plavni players
NK Veres Rivne players
MFC Mykolaiv players
FC Balkany Zorya players
Footballers from Donetsk
Association football midfielders
Ukrainian First League players